Canadian National 7312 is an 0-6-0 "Switcher" type steam locomotive originally built by the Baldwin Locomotive Works in August 1908 for the Canadian National Railway. It is owned and in active restoration  by the Strasburg Rail Road outside of Strasburg, Pennsylvania.

History
The engine was built by the Baldwin Locomotive Works in August 1908 for the Grand Trunk Railway as No. 118. The No. 118 was renumbered to No. 1708 in September 1919. In January 1923, the Grand Trunk Railway was merged into the Canadian National Railway. Three months after the creation of Canadian National, No. 1708 was renumbered to No. 7157, a number the locomotive carried until February 1952 when it was renumbered to No. 7240. In 1957, the locomotive received its final CN number as No. 7312. In July 1958, No. 7312 was retired at Stratford, Ontario where it had been working as the shop switcher.

In June 1959, No. 7312 was discovered by Strasburg Rail Road Vice President Bud Swearer who was visiting the CN yard at Stratford. The Strasburg Rail Road had intended to purchase a steam locomotive to power freight and passenger excursions and No. 7312 was of appropriate size for the operation. The Strasburg Rail Road negotiated the CN for the locomotive, which was ultimately purchased by a consortium of Strasburg Rail Road officials. Arriving at Strasburg in June 1960, the locomotive was renumbered to No. 31 and placed into service on September 1, 1960, becoming the first steam locomotive to reenter service in the United States. The locomotive was purchased outright by the Strasburg Rail Road in 1968. The locomotive continued to remain in service up until early 2009 when No. 7312 was taken off the active roster for the locomotive's heavy extensive Federal Railroad Administration (FRA) 1,472 day inspection and overhaul. No. 7312 has been stripped apart since then, still awaiting for its overhaul. However, due to the railroad's busy contract work and upkeep of their fleet of four other operable steam locomotives (GW 90, CN 89, Thomas BEDT 15, N&W 475) work was slow, if not non-existent. However, since 2021, work began a new, with significant progress being reported. Work stopped again in 2022, but the locomotive was recently moved to the backshop in early 2023, with hopes of completion by years end.

Gallery

See also
Great Western 90
Norfolk and Western 475
Canadian National 89
Canadian National 1009
Canadian National 7470
Canadian National class O-9 0-6-0

References

7312
0-6-0 locomotives
Baldwin locomotives
Individual locomotives of Canada
Preserved steam locomotives of Canada
Standard gauge locomotives of Canada
Railway locomotives introduced in 1908
Standard gauge locomotives of the United States

Preserved steam locomotives of Pennsylvania